Justice is a 1917 British silent crime film directed by Maurice Elvey and starring Gerald du Maurier, Hilda Moore, and Lilian Braithwaite. It was based on the 1910 play Justice by John Galsworthy. It is not known whether the film currently survives, which suggests that it is a lost film.

Cast
 Gerald du Maurier as Falder
 Hilda Moore as Ruth Honeywell
 Lilian Braithwaite as Falder's Sister
 James Carew as Wister
 E. Vivian Reynolds as James How
 Douglas Munro as Cokeson
 Hayford Hobbs as Walter How
 Margaret Bannerman as Miss Cokeson
 Teddy Arundell as Honeywell
 Bert Wynne as Davis
 Hubert Willis as Brother-in-Law
 Frank Dane as Frome
 Edward O'Neill as Governor

Reception
Like many American films of the time, the British film Justice was subject to cuts and restrictions by American city and state film censorship boards. For example, the Chicago Board of Censors cut, in Reel 2, the man stealing from a safe and, in Reel 3, the entire scene of the prisoner attacking guard, taking keys, changing clothes, etc., to where the prisoner leaves the cell.

References

External links

Films based on works by John Galsworthy
1917 films
British silent feature films
1917 crime films
1910s English-language films
Films directed by Maurice Elvey
British films based on plays
Ideal Film Company films
British black-and-white films
British crime films
1910s British films